After The Night Falls is a 2007 collaborative album from Robin Guthrie,  formerly of the Cocteau Twins and ambient artist Harold Budd.  It was released, as a matched CD, on the same day as Before the Day Breaks, also by Guthrie and Budd.

Track listing 

 "How Distant Your Heart" – 4:03
 "Avenue of Shapes" – 3:27
 "Seven Thousand Sunny Years" – 6:19
 "She Is My Strength" – 2:52
 "Inside, a Golden Echo" – 3:24
 "Open Book" – 5:17
 "And Then I Turned Away" – 3:30
 "The Girl With Colorful Thoughts" – 4:26
 "Turn Off the Sun" – 4:58

References 

Harold Budd albums
Robin Guthrie albums
2007 albums
Ambient albums by Scottish artists
Ambient albums by American artists